Mount Pleasant Commercial Historic District may refer to:

Mount Pleasant Commercial Historic District (Mount Pleasant, Tennessee), listed on the NRHP in Tennessee
Mount Pleasant Commercial Historic District (Mount Pleasant, Utah), listed on the NRHP in Utah

See also
Mount Pleasant Historic District (disambiguation)